Nannodiella is a genus of sea snails, marine gastropod mollusks in the family Clathurellidae.

Species
Species within the genus Nannodiella include:
 Nannodiella acricula (Hedley, 1922) 
 Nannodiella baracoesa Espinosa, Ortea & Moro, 2017
 Nannodiella candidula (Reeve, 1846)
 Nannodiella cubadiella Espinosa, Ortea & Moro, 2017
 Nannodiella elatior (d'Orbigny, 1847)
 Nannodiella fraternalis (Dall, 1919)
 Nannodiella hukuiensis (Nomura & Niino, 1940)
 Nannodiella melanitica (Dall, 1901)
 Nannodiella nana (Dall, 1919)
 Nannodiella oxia (Bush, 1885)
 Nannodiella vespuciana (d'Orbigny, 1842)

References

External links
 Dall W.H. (1919). Descriptions of new species of mollusks of the family Turritidae from the west coast of America and adjacent regions. Proceedings of the United States National Museum. 56(2288): 1-86, pis 1-24
  Bouchet, P.; Kantor, Y. I.; Sysoev, A.; Puillandre, N. (2011). A new operational classification of the Conoidea (Gastropoda). Journal of Molluscan Studies. 77(3): 273-308

 
Gastropod genera